Cosm may refer to:
 Cosm (software), a family of open distributed computing software and protocols

COSM may refer to:
 Composite Object Sound Modeling, a proprietary digital amplifier modeling technology developed by Roland Corporation

CoSM may refer to:
 The Chapel of Sacred Mirrors, in Wappinger, New York, USA

See also 

 macrocosm and microcosm, interpretation of view of the cosmos